Pierre Benoît (died 20 May 1786) was a Malecite Indian who was murdered by settlers in York County, New Brunswick.

He is important to the early history of Canada, and more particularly New Brunswick in that the trial of the two accused following his death was swift and set a standard of justice that was inclusive of First Nations people.

References

1786 deaths
Maliseet people
Year of birth unknown
People murdered in Canada